Zabirova is a surname. Notable people with the surname include:

Tolkyn Zabirova (born 1970), Kazakhstani female singer
Zulfiya Zabirova (born 1973), Russian cycle racer

See also
Zafirova